is a passenger railway station located in the city of Takamatsu, Kagawa, Japan.  It is operated by the private transportation company Takamatsu-Kotohira Electric Railroad (Kotoden) and is designated station "S03".

Lines
Oki-Matsushima Station is a station of the Kotoden Shido Line and is located 1.9 km from the opposing terminus of the line at Kawaramachi Station].

Layout
The station consists of one side platform serving a singe bi-directional track. There is no station building and the station is unmanned.

Adjacent stations

History
Oki-Matsushima Station opened on November 18, 1911 on the Tosan Electric Tramway. On November 1, 1943 it became a station on the Takamatsu-Kotohira Electric Railway.

Surrounding area
Takamatsu General Gymnasium
Takamatsu City Fukuokamachi Pool

See also
 List of railway stations in Japan

References

External links

  

Railway stations in Takamatsu
Railway stations in Japan opened in 1911
Stations of Takamatsu-Kotohira Electric Railroad